Pteris semipinnata is a fern species in the Pteridoideae subfamily of the Pteridaceae. It is mainly distributed in tropical regions, such as southern China, the Philippines, Vietnam, Laos, Thailand, Myanmar, Malaysia, Sri Lanka and northern India. It is also found in Japan (Ryukyu Islands) and Bhutan. Pteris semipinnata grows in open forests, on the acid soil near streams or rocks, below 900 meters above sea level. It is native to Hong Kong and Taiwan. It should also be native to China (According to the description of Flora of China (series) for the content of "Flora of China"). In any case, Hong Kong is currently a city in China, so it can be said that Pteris semipinnata is native to China.

References

semipinnata
Plants described in 1753
Taxa named by Carl Linnaeus